Lipník nad Bečvou is a town in Přerov District in the Olomouc Region of the Czech Republic. It has about 7,800 inhabitants. The historic town centre is well preserved and is protected by law as an urban monument reservation.

Administrative parts

Lipník nad Bečvou is made up of five town parts and villages:
Lipník nad Bečvou I-Město
Lipník nad Bečvou III-Nové Dvory
Lipník nad Bečvou V-Podhoří
Lipník nad Bečvou VI-Loučka
Lipník nad Bečvou VII-Trnávka

Geography
It is situated on the right bank of the Bečva river. It lies in the Moravian Gate lowland.

History

The first written mention of Lipník is from 1238. It was a settlement on an important trade route that passed through the Moravian Gate and led to Silesia. Between 1256 and 1266, Drahotuš Castle was founded on a nearby hill and Lipník became the economic centre of the newly established estate. King John of Bohemia bought Lipník probably from Duke Nicholas I and then sold the estate to the lords of Kravaře in 1325. The settlement prospered and developed because according to a deed from 1349, Lipník was already a rich town. During the rule of the lords of Kravaře, Lipník obtained various privileges.

Lipník was owned by the lord of Sovinec in 1447–1467 and by the Kostka of Postupice family in 1467–1475. In 1475, the estate was bought by William II of Pernstein and attached to his extensive assets. In the 16th century, owned by the Pernsteins, Lipník experienced economic growth and general prosperity. The town fortifications were strengthened and guilds were established. The Jewish population was documented from 1454, a Jewish quarter was formed in the first third of the 16th century at the latest.

In 1580, Lipník was obtained by marriage by Peter Vok of Rosenberg, but he was forced to sell it to the Bruntálský of Vrbno family in 1593. They had built a Renaissance castle here in 1609. The properties of the Bruntálský of Vrbno family were confiscated after Bohemian Revolt, and the town was acquired by Cardinal Franz von Dietrichstein. His house owned Lipník until 1858. In 1634, Franz von Dietrichstein invited the Piarists into the town. They operated here until 1884.

The plague epidemic of 1623–1624 and the Thirty Years' War caused a significant decline in population and economic losses. The stagnation of the town lasted until the 1840s when the town gates and some bastions were demolished, the imperial road was relocated and, above all, Emperor Ferdinand Northern Railway was built. Lipník became an important transhipment point, which brought a new economic impetus. Large markets were held here and crafts developed. In the second half of the 19th century, the town became industrialized.

A large fire in 1858 caused Neoclassical reconstructions in the town centre.

Demographics

Transport
Lipník nad Bečvou has a station on the international railway Prague–Olomouc–Lipník nad Bečvou–Púchov. The railway station is also served by local lines to Přerov, Hranice and Valašské Meziříčí.

The D1 motorway leading from Přerov to Ostrava bypasses the town in the north. The branch of the motorway, which continues as the D35 leading to Olomouc, is located on the municipal border.

The town also lies on the Kraków–Moravia–Vienna Greenway, a long distance cycling route.

Sights

Lipník nad Bečvou has a valuable historic core with highly preserved original layout. The town centre is formed by the T. G. Masaryk Square in the shape of the letter L, and its surroundings, delimited by fragments of the town fortifications. The town centre contains 109 houses, which are protected as cultural monuments.

The town square is lined with Renaissance houses with arcades. The town hall was completely reconstructed in the Neoclassical style in 1851. In the middle of the square are two fountains from 1699 and 1859, and a Marian column from 1694.

Next to the square is located the parish Church of Saint James the Great. This originally Gothic church was built before 1400. In the 1760s, baroque modifications were made and also its contemporary interior was created. The separate bell tower next to the church dates from 1609. It is the only bell tower in Moravia preserved in the original late Renaissance style. It contains three bells, including Jakub from 1464 and Michal, which is one of the largest bells in Moravia.

The Renaissance castle was reconstructed in Neoclassical style in the 1860s. Today it houses a part of the municipal office. The castle includes an English-style castle park, founded originally as a French formal garden in the mid-17th century. The terrace on the roof of the former stables is arranged as a garden. Next to the castle is located the former Piarist college from 1637–1641, and the Church of Saint Francis of Assisi from 1682–1687. The college is in poor condition and inaccessible; the church is used for cultural purposes.

The large Jewish community is commemorated by several monuments, including the former synagogue and two Jewish cemeteries. The synagogue was first mentioned in 1540 and was built shortly before that, together with the town walls. It is the second oldest preserved synagogue in the country. Today it serves as a prayer house of the Czechoslovak Hussite Church.

Notable people
Yair Bacharach (1639–1702), German rabbi
Gregor Mendel (1822–1884), Austrian biologist; studied here in 1833–1834
Wilhelm von Gutmann (1826–1895), Austrian businessman
Sigmund Friedl (1851–1914), Austrian philatelist
Emanuel Schreiber (1852–1932), Austrian rabbi and publicist
Bernhard Münz (1856–1919), Austrian writer and philosopher
Pavel Vranský (1921–2018), World War II pilot
Jan Smolík (born 1942), cyclist

Twin towns – sister cities

Lipník nad Bečvou is twinned with:
 Zdzieszowice, Poland

References

External links

Cities and towns in the Czech Republic
Populated places in Přerov District
Shtetls